Girolamo Orsaja, O.M. (died 1683) was a Roman Catholic prelate who served as Archbishop of Rossano (1676–1683).

Biography
Girolamo Orsaja was ordained a priest in the Order of Minims.
On 24 February 1676, he was appointed during the papacy of Pope Clement X as Archbishop of Rossano.
On 1 March 1676, he was consecrated bishop by Bernardino Rocci, Bishop of Orvieto, with Francesco de' Marini, Titular Archbishop of Amasea, and Giuseppe Eusanio, Titular Bishop of Porphyreon, serving as co-consecrators. 
He served as Archbishop of Rossano until his death on 13 June 1683.

References

External links and additional sources
 (for Chronology of Bishops)
 (for Chronology of Bishops)

Minims (religious order)

17th-century Italian Roman Catholic archbishops
Bishops appointed by Pope Clement X
1683 deaths